Stéphane Laurent Lannoy (born 18 September 1969 in Boulogne-sur-Mer) is a French football referee. Lannoy played football at an early age before moving into officiating matches. He has been a FIFA international referee since 2006. He lives in Sailly-sur-la-Lys and works as a video games distributor. He has refereed games at the 2008 Olympics, in the UEFA Champions League, UEFA Cup and qualifiers for the UEFA Euro 2008 and 2010 FIFA World Cup.

He was selected as a referee for the 2010 FIFA World Cup. Lannoy refereed the group stage match between The Netherlands and Denmark and the match between Brazil and Ivory Coast. He was also picked as one referee of the referees for UEFA Euro 2012. On 28 June 2012, Lannoy refereed the Euro 2012 semifinal between Italy and Germany, won 2–1 by Italy. He booked Mario Balotelli, in accordance with UEFA guidelines, for taking his shirt off after a goal celebration.

References

1969 births
Living people
People from Boulogne-sur-Mer
Sportspeople from Pas-de-Calais
French football referees
2010 FIFA World Cup referees
UEFA Champions League referees
UEFA Euro 2012 referees